Ekemblemaria lira is a species of chaenopsid blenny known from a single specimen from Las Palmas, near Esmeraldas, Ecuador, in the eastern Pacific ocean.

References
 Hastings, P. A. 1992 (18 Aug.) Ekemblemaria lira, a new blennioid fish from Ecuador, with comments on sexual dimorphism and relationships in Ekemblemaria (Teleostei: Chaenopsidae). Copeia 1992 (no. 3): 769–776.

lira
Fish described in 1992